Ruan Vinicius Silva de Jesus (born 21 October 1998), commonly known as Ruan, is a Brazilian footballer who currently plays as a defender for Vera Cruz-PE, on loan from Retrô.

Career statistics

Club

Notes

References

1998 births
Living people
Brazilian footballers
Association football defenders
Clube Náutico Capibaribe players
Associação Chapecoense de Futebol players
Sport Club Atibaia players
Retrô Futebol Clube Brasil players
Vera Cruz Futebol Clube players